Trochosaurus (from  , 'badger' and  , 'lizard') is an extinct genus of South African therocephalians. In 1915 and later, some of its member species were first described by Robert Broom as Trochosuchus spp. (e.g., Trochosuchus major) and later reassigned to the new genus. The genus includes some of the most primitive known   Therocephalia.

See also

 List of therapsids

References 

Therocephalia genera
Permian synapsids
Permian synapsids of Africa
Fossil taxa described in 1915
Taxa named by Sidney H. Haughton